The East Camden and Highland Railroad  is a Class III short-line railroad headquartered in East Camden, Arkansas.

EACH operates a 47.6 mile (76.6 km) line in Arkansas from East Camden to Eagle Mills (where it interchanges with Union Pacific Railroad).  EACH traffic generally consists of lumber, paper products and scrap paper, synthetic bulk rubber, and chemicals.

EACH also provides switching services at locations in four states:
The Highland Industrial Park in East Camden (formerly the Shumaker Ordnance Depot), with interchange to Union Pacific
The Louisiana Army Ammunition Plant at Doyline, Louisiana, with interchange to Kansas City Southern Railway
The Iowa Army Ammunition Plant at Middletown, Iowa, with interchange to BNSF Railway
The Milan Army Ammunition Plant at Milan, Tennessee, with interchanges to CSX Transportation and Norfolk Southern

EACH was incorporated in 1971.

External links

 Link to Union Pacific Website with EACH Details
 East Camden and Highland Railroad website

Arkansas railroads
Switching and terminal railroads
Defunct Louisiana railroads
Transportation in Ouachita County, Arkansas